Ministry of Expatriates may refer to:

Ministry of Expatriates (Bangladesh)
Ministry of Expatriates (Syria)